William Hamilton Punton (born 9 May 1934) is a Scottish former footballer and manager.

Born in Ormiston, East Lothian, Punton was a left-sided winger who played for Portadown before signing for Newcastle United in February 1954. He made his Football League debut in April 1954 against Manchester City, but did not appear in the first team again for almost 18 months. He made 23 league appearances during his four-year spell at the club. In July 1958, he was sold to Southend United in a part exchange deal which saw Southend's John McGuigan join Newcastle. A year later he joined Norwich City, where he made over 200 league appearances. He also scored for Norwich in the 1962 Football League Cup Final against Rochdale. He went on to play for Sheffield United, Scunthorpe and Yarmouth Town.

At the end of his playing career, Punton moved into management, spending 20 years in charge of Great Yarmouth Town. He later became manager of Diss Town, leading them to victory in the FA Vase final in 1994, beating Taunton Town 2-1 after Extra time with the Diss goals scored by Paul Gibbs from a penalty and the winner from Peter Mendham.

References
General
Canary Citizens by Mark Davage, John Eastwood, Kevin Platt, published by Jarrold Publishing, (2001), 
Specific

External links
 

1934 births
Living people
People from Ormiston
Scottish footballers
Newcastle United F.C. players
English Football League players
Southend United F.C. players
Norwich City F.C. players
Sheffield United F.C. players
Scunthorpe United F.C. players
Great Yarmouth Town F.C. players
Scottish football managers
Great Yarmouth Town F.C. managers
Diss Town F.C. managers
Association football wingers